This is a list of mayors of Le Châtelard, Switzerland. Le Châtelard or "Le Châtelard-Montreux" is a former municipality of the canton of Vaud. From 1953, its name was "Montreux-Le Châtelard". It merged in 1962 with Montreux-Planches to form Montreux. 

For later mayors, see:
List of mayors of Montreux

Montreux
Chatelard
 
Lists of mayors (complete 1900-2013)